Cape Flying Fish (also known as Cape Dart)  is an ice-covered cape which forms the western extremity of Thurston Island. It was discovered by Richard E. Byrd and members of the US Antarctic Program in a flight from the USS Bear in February 1940.

Cape Flying Fish separates the Amundsen Sea in the west from the Bellingshausen Sea in the east. It constitutes the eastern boundary of the Walgreen Coast, and the western boundary of the Eights Coast.

Maps
 Thurston Island – Jones Mountains. 1:500000 Antarctica Sketch Map. US Geological Survey, 1967.
 Antarctic Digital Database (ADD). Scale 1:250000 topographic map of Antarctica. Scientific Committee on Antarctic Research (SCAR), 1993–2016.

References 

Headlands of Ellsworth Land